Uroš Nikolić (born 20 July 1996) is a Serbian swimmer. He competed in the men's 4 × 100 metre freestyle relay at the 2020 Summer Olympics.

References

External links
 
 

1996 births
Living people
Serbian male swimmers
Serbian male freestyle swimmers
Olympic swimmers of Serbia
Swimmers at the 2020 Summer Olympics
Swimmers at the 2014 Summer Youth Olympics
Swimmers at the 2018 Mediterranean Games
Swimmers at the 2022 Mediterranean Games
Mediterranean Games medalists in swimming
Mediterranean Games gold medalists for Serbia
Mediterranean Games silver medalists for Serbia
20th-century Serbian people
21st-century Serbian people